The 1984 Dallas Grand Prix was a Formula One motor race held on July 8, 1984 at Fair Park in Dallas, Texas. It was the only running of the Dallas Grand Prix as a Formula One race, and the ninth race of the 1984 Formula One World Championship.

The 67-lap race was held in very hot weather on a disintegrating track, and was won by Finnish driver Keke Rosberg, driving a Williams-Honda, with Frenchman René Arnoux second in a Ferrari and Italian Elio de Angelis third in a Lotus-Renault. Englishman Nigel Mansell took pole position in the other Lotus-Renault and led the first half of the race, before suffering a gearbox failure at the very end and collapsing from exhaustion while trying to push his car over the finish line.

Summary

Keke Rosberg of Finland won his only race of the season at the Dallas Grand Prix. The race was one of only two races in 1984 where both of the year's dominant McLarens  driven by Niki Lauda and Alain Prost did not score (Belgium being the other), and gave Honda their first turbocharged Grand Prix win and also their first Grand Prix win since the 1967 Italian Grand Prix. René Arnoux's Ferrari was the only other car on the lead lap at the end after starting from the pit lane due to an electrical fault on the warm up lap, while Elio de Angelis came home third for Lotus. It was the only race of the season that cars using Goodyear tyres filled all three podium positions. Only 8 cars finished the race, due to crashes or engine failures in up to  heat, and also the track was breaking up very badly, as in the 1980 Argentine Grand Prix.

The event was conceived as a way to demonstrate Dallas's status as a "world-class city" and overcame  heat, a disintegrating track surface and weekend-long rumors of its cancellation. The tight and twisty course was laid out on the Texas State Fair Grounds with help from United States Grand Prix West founder Chris Pook, and featured two hairpin curves. While the layout was seen as interesting and was generally well received by the drivers (though some thought one or two of the chicanes made it tighter than it needed to be), all had issues with the lack of run-off areas and the crumbling surface which during the race itself made the track more like a rallycross track than a Grand Prix circuit. It was bubbling before qualifying, and after a few laps, it began to break apart.

After the first practice on Friday, the Lotus drivers, Nigel Mansell and de Angelis, who both started from the front row with Mansell recording his first career pole position, said the temporary course was the roughest circuit they had ever driven. Nelson Piquet wondered whether the track, the drivers or the cars would break first in the oppressive heat. Afternoon qualifying saw temperatures continue to rise past , and Goodyear recorded the highest track temperature in their 20 years of racing, .

Dallas was the first time since the 1978 Dutch Grand Prix at Zandvoort that both Lotus drivers qualified on the front row of the grid. Back then, it was  World Champion Mario Andretti and his teammate Ronnie Peterson who qualified 1–2 in the revolutionary Lotus 79.

After the Renault celebrity race on Saturday, Stirling Moss introduced himself to former US President Jimmy Carter in the VIP suite, saying, "I have never shaken hands with a president." Carter, to the surprise of many (due to the general belief that Formula One drivers weren't as well known in America as the Indy 500 and NASCAR drivers), recognized Moss immediately.

The race was scheduled to start at 11 am on Sunday, three hours earlier than usual, because of the heat, with the 30-minute warm-up planned for 7:45 am. This was apparently too early for French Williams driver Jacques Laffite, who arrived at the circuit in his pajamas. The warm-up was delayed and then canceled however, because a 50-lap Can-Am race on Saturday had damaged the circuit so badly that emergency repairs had gone on all night, and would continue until 30 minutes before the start (the repairs involved a backhoe digging up the broken asphalt and replacing it with quick-dry cement). Niki Lauda and Alain Prost tried to arrange a boycott among the drivers, but Rosberg insisted they should race.

Bernie Ecclestone did not want to have 90,000 disappointed fans at the circuit, and viewers around the world, so the race went off with Larry Hagman (J. R. Ewing from the television series Dallas) waving the green flag to start the parade lap.

Mansell led for almost half the race from his first pole position. Derek Warwick overtook de Angelis, whose engine was suffering from a misfire, and pulled alongside Mansell several times, but could not get around. He retired after an attempt to pass on lap 11 resulted in a spin. Lauda was next to challenge Mansell, but he was passed by de Angelis when the latter's engine began to run on all six cylinders.

The first five cars (Mansell, de Angelis, Lauda, Rosberg, Prost) were now running as a group, and on lap 14, Rosberg passed Lauda for third and closed up on the two Lotuses. He passed de Angelis on lap 18, and soon was looking for a way past Mansell. Arnoux, having qualified fourth, had been unable to start his car on the grid, and began the race from the back of the pack. By the end of the first lap, he had already passed seven cars and now he and Piquet were closing on the group of leaders.

Rosberg, after briefly trading places with Prost, who had gotten by Lauda and de Angelis, finally forced Mansell into a big enough mistake for him to take the lead. Within three laps, Mansell, whose front tires were quickly fading, had dropped three more places before pitting on lap 38. Piquet became the ninth car to retire because of contact with the wall, and Arnoux moved into the top five.

Prost took the lead from Rosberg on lap 49, and quickly opened a 7.5-second lead, but eight laps later struck a wall and damaged a wheel rim. Rosberg inherited a lead of 10 seconds over Arnoux, and, thanks in part to a special skull cap driver cooling system, held on to score his only victory of the year for Williams, as the two-hour limit was reached one lap short of the scheduled 68.

De Angelis came home third, comfortably ahead of Laffite in the second Williams. De Angelis's teammate Mansell made contact with the wall.  Mansell coasted around the last corner, visor up and seat belts hanging over the side of the car.  As his car slowed on the home straight, he leaped from his black Lotus and tried to push it to the end, but collapsed from exhaustion and the oppressive heat before reaching the finish line. He was classified sixth, three laps behind.

The oppressive heat was a factor of the Dallas Grand Prix becoming a one-off, and the event was replaced by the following year's Australian Grand Prix. Formula One has since returned to the state of Texas, hosting the United States Grand Prix since 2012 at the newly constructed Circuit of the Americas, located in the state capital of Austin. However, the race in Austin has always been held in October or November, away from the Texan summer.

The heat also caused some drivers to take some countermeasures to cope with the heat; such as Rosberg's water-cooled skullcap (a common device in the NASCAR circuit); Piercarlo Ghinzani, who finished fifth after overtaking the collapsed Mansell, having a bucket of cold water thrown over him during a pit stop; and Huub Rothengatter, who dashed straight to a spectator area after he retired from the race, where he commandeered several cups of water "for pouring over his nether regions…".

Ayrton Senna had retired from the race on lap 47 while running fourth after hitting the wall. On coming back to the pits, he was furious, telling his race engineer Pat Symonds: "I just cannot understand how I did that. I was taking it no differently than I had been before. The wall must have moved." His team did not believe him and Senna persuaded them to inspect the wall after the race, only for them to find that the barrier had indeed been moved by an earlier crash, moving only a mere  into the track. Symonds recalled his amazement in 2004, saying: "That was when the precision to which he was driving really hit home for me. Don't forget, this was a guy in his first season of F1, straight out of F3...".

Classification

Qualifying

Race

Championship standings after the race

Drivers' Championship standings

Constructors' Championship standings

References

Dallas Grand Prix
Dallas Grand Prix
Dallas Grand Prix
Dallas Grand Prix
Dallas Grand Prix
Fair Park